Night Sail is a 1985 sculpture by Louise Nevelson, installed in Los Angeles, California, United States. The artwork weighs 33 tons, and has been described by the Los Angeles Times as "a mysterious, Cubist collage of nautical and geometric forms in aluminum and steel".

References 

1985 sculptures
Aluminum sculptures in California
Cubist sculptures
Outdoor sculptures in Greater Los Angeles
Steel sculptures in California
Bunker Hill, Los Angeles